The Carl Nielsen Monument, located at the corner of Grønningen and Store Kongensgade in central Copenhagen, Denmark, is a monument to Danish composer Carl Nielsen created by his wife Anne Marie Carl-Nielsen. It depicts a young man playing pan-pipes on a wingless Pegasus and is also known as The Genius of Music. The original plaster model is owned by the Carl Nielsen Museum in Odense.

Description

The monument is an allegorical equestrian statue. Horse and man are depicted in a dynamic pose. The naked young man with pan-pipes  represents Pan, god of music in Greek mythology. His face strongly resembles that of a young Carl Nielsen. The Pegasus figure had wings in Anne Marie Carl-Nielsen's earlier models but the wings were left out in the final design.

Carl-Nielsen has commented on the design that "What I wanted to show in my figure is the forward movement, the sense of life, the fact that nothing stands still."

History

Carl Nielsen died on 3 October 1931. The monument was a donation from the Committee for the Creation of a Monument to the Composer Carl Nielsen and the Foundation for the Advancement of Artistic Purposes.

Anne Marie Carl-Nielsen was commissioned to design the monument. She worked on it in her studio in Civiletatens Materialgård at Frederiksholms Kanal 26. She wrote: "I wanted to take the winged horse, eternal symbol of poetry, and place a musician on its back. He was to sit there between the rushing wings blowing a reed pipe out over Copenhagen". Dispute about her design and a shortfall in funding meant that the monument was delayed and that Anne Marie herself ended up subsidising it. It was finally unveiled on 17 December 1939.

References

Citations

External links

 Image of earlier design
 
 Source

Outdoor sculptures in Copenhagen
Monuments to composers
Bronze sculptures in Copenhagen
Sculptures by Anne Marie Carl-Nielsen
1939 sculptures
Statue
Equestrian statues in Copenhagen
Statues of men in Copenhagen
Statues of musicians
Cultural depictions of classical musicians
Cultural depictions of Danish men